Gone Fishin' is a fishing video game for DOS released in 1994 by Amtex. The player takes part of a fishing tournament in  the Bay of Quinte in Lake Ontario. This includes buying fishing equipment at a store and getting advice from both the storekeeper and an older man at a nearby fishing lodge.

External links

1994 video games
DOS games
DOS-only games
Fishing video games
Video games set in Canada
Video games developed in Canada